Petro Gebey (20 July 1864 – 26 April 1931) was a Ruthenian Greek Catholic hierarch. He was bishop of the Ruthenian Catholic Eparchy of Mukacheve from 1924 to 1931.

Biography
Born in Kalnyk, Austrian Empire (present day – Zakarpattia Oblast, Ukraine) in 1864, he was ordained a priest on 13 October 1889. He was appointed the Bishop by the Holy See on 16 July 1924. He was consecrated to the Episcopate on 3 August 1924. The principal consecrator was Bishop Dionizije Njaradi, and the principal co-consecrators were Blessed Bishop Josaphat Kotsylovsky and Bishop Karol Józef Fischer.

He died in Uzhhorod on 26 April 1931.

See also

Ruthenian Greek Catholic Church

References 

1864 births
1931 deaths
20th-century Eastern Catholic bishops
Ruthenian Catholic bishops
People from Zakarpattia Oblast